HMCS Provider was a Fairmile depot ship constructed for the Royal Canadian Navy during World War II. Commissioned in December 1942, Provider served as a base ship in the Caribbean Sea, in Quebec and at Halifax, Nova Scotia. Following the war, the vessel was sold into commercial service and converted into a tanker in 1946. The ship re-entered service in  1947 and was renamed Maruba. The ship sailed under this name until 1956, when it was sold and renamed Olaya. Renamed Orgenos the same year, the tanker was acquired by the Peruvian Navy in 1960. In 1961, Orgenus was sold for scrap and broken up in Peru. The ship's registry was not deleted until 1992.

Description
The ship was either armed with one  naval gun and two  cannon or one 12-pounder  naval gun. The ship was designed to be a Fairmile B Motor Launch depot ship and was fitted with a machine shop, spare accommodations and extra fuel and store spaces. The vessel had a ship's company of 107, with 20 officers and 87 ratings.

Service history
The vessel was constructed at the Marine Industries shipyard at Sorel, Quebec in 1941–1942 and given the yard number 105. The ship was launched in December 1942 and named Provider. Provider was commissioned on 1 December, the second vessel of its design to enter Canadian service after sister ship . Provider sailed for Halifax, Nova Scotia and was transferred to the Caribbean Sea with two flotillas of Fairmile Motor Launches. However, while en route, Provider was damaged in a storm and was forced to return to Halifax. Provider departed Halifax on 29 December and arrived at Trinidad on 20 February 1943. There, Provider and the flotillas alleviated the shortage of patrol forces in the region, with Provider acting as the base ship for the Fairmiles. Provider sailed for Guantánamo Bay, Cuba and was joined there by the 73rd Flotilla of Fairmile Motor Launches. The two units then moved on to Key West, Florida. Provider returned to Halifax on 23 April 1943.

Provider was then allocated to Gaspé Force, arriving at Gaspé, Quebec on 23 April in the Gulf of St. Lawrence. The vessel was then sent further up the St. Lawrence River to Sept-Îles, Quebec arriving on 29 June and remaining there until November. Provider then sailed for Halifax, before heading on to Bermuda to serve as base ship for the 70th and 78th Fairmile flotillas. The ship returned to Halifax to become the base supply ship before being paid off on 22 March 1946.

The ship was sold in 1946 to Lunham & Moore (Tankers) Ltd and converted into a tanker. Registered in Montreal, the vessel was renamed Maruba and re-entered service in 1947. Maruba was sold to Empresa Petrolera Fiscal in 1956, renamed Olaya and registered in Callao. The same year, the vessel was renamed Orgenos. In 1960, the Peruvian Navy acquired Orgenos but the vessel was taken out of service in 1961 and sold for scrap. Orgenos was broken up in Peru in 1961, but the vessel's registry was not deleted until 1992.

Notes

Citations

Sources
 
 
 
 
 

Auxiliary ships of the Royal Canadian Navy
1942 ships
Auxiliary ships of the Peruvian Navy